Angelo Recchi (born 27 March 1951) is a retired Italian professional footballer.

References

1951 births
Living people
Italian footballers
Serie A players
Serie B players
Mantova 1911 players
Ascoli Calcio 1898 F.C. players
Delfino Pescara 1936 players
A.C. Cesena players
Inter Milan players
A.C. Ancona players
Association football goalkeepers